Ibrahima Touré (born 17 December 1985) is a Senegalese former footballer who last played as a striker for Gazélec Ajaccio in the Domino's Ligue 2.

He also played for Al Nasr , Chengdu Wuniu, Wydad Casablanca, Paykan, Persepolis, Sepahan, Ajman and Monaco. He also plays for the Senegal national football team.

Life and career
Born in Dakar, Touré played for the Academy Gentina Aldo during his youth. He spent one month with Metz during the 2004–05 season, an experience that he described as leaving "a bitter taste". In February 2005, as a part of a co-operation project between Metz and the Chengdu Football Association, Touré moved to China League One side Chengdu Wuniu on a free transfer. Wearing the number 10 shirt, he scored two goals in 18 league games during the 2005 season. Touré was also sent off twice.

After spending time in China, Touré joined Wydad Casablanca. Two years later, he joined Paykan on loan and scored 13 goals in 21 matches during the 2007–08 Iran Pro League campaign. Touré was transferred to Persepolis in 2008 and scored 11 league goals in his only season with the club. He moved to Sepahan in 2009 and helped the club win the Iran Pro League in successive seasons, scoring 18 goals in both campaigns. Touré was signed by United Arab Emirates club Ajman in 2011 and continued to score regularly. He had scored 14 goals in 16 league and cup matches by January 2012, which led to interest from other clubs. Touré joined Ligue 2 side Monaco later that month for an undisclosed fee, and scored ten goals in 17 league appearances during the second half of the 2011–12 season.

The following season, Touré played in 35 league games and scored 18 goals, which helped Monaco win the Ligue 2 championship and promotion back to Ligue 1.

On 14 August 2013 Touré signed for Al Nasr of the UAE Pro-League.

Career statistics
.

Honours
Sepahan
 Iran Pro League: 2009–10, 2010–11

Monaco
 Ligue 2: 2012–13

References

External links
 
 
 

1985 births
Living people
Footballers from Dakar
Senegalese footballers
Senegal international footballers
Senegalese expatriate footballers
Senegalese expatriate sportspeople in Monaco
Association football forwards
FC Metz players
Wydad AC players
Chengdu Tiancheng F.C. players
Paykan F.C. players
Persepolis F.C. players
Sepahan S.C. footballers
Ajman Club players
Al-Nasr SC (Dubai) players
Liaoning F.C. players
Gazélec Ajaccio players
Chinese Super League players
China League One players
Ligue 2 players
UAE Pro League players
Persian Gulf Pro League players
Expatriate footballers in China
Expatriate footballers in Iran
Expatriate footballers in Monaco
Expatriate footballers in Morocco
Expatriate footballers in the United Arab Emirates